Kadri Kõusaar (born 8 September 1980 in Pärnu) an Estonian writer, film director, translator and television presenter.

She has been literary editor for Eesti Ekspress cultural supplement. She has hosted the television programs Mandolino (with Alex Lepajõe), and in 2011 Seks ja küla.

Works

Novels
 2001: Ego
 2004: Vaba tõus
 2011: Alfa

Filmography
 2007: Magnus (feature film)
 2013: Kohtumõistja
 2014: Auster (short feature film)
 2016: Ema ('Mother')
 2021: Deserted

References

External links
 

Living people
1980 births
Estonian women novelists
Estonian women journalists
Estonian women film directors
Estonian television presenters
Estonian translators
Estonian editors
University of Tartu alumni
People from Pärnu
21st-century Estonian women